Enterprise or USS Enterprise (often referred to as the "starship Enterprise") is the name of several fictional spacecraft, some of which are the main craft and setting for various television series and films in the Star Trek science fiction franchise.  The most notable were Captain James T. Kirk's  from the original 1960s television series, and Captain Jean-Luc Picard's  from Star Trek: The Next Generation.

Depiction

Pre-Federation era 
Two spacecraft with the name Enterprise predate the United Federation of Planets in Star Treks fictional timeline.

 Registry: USS Enterprise (XCV 330)
 Class: Declaration
 Service: circa 2130s
 Captain: Unknown

This USS Enterprise (XCV 330) appears in Star Trek: The Motion Picture (1979) among a series of illustrations depicting ships named Enterprise. It also appears as a model in Star Trek Into Darkness (2013), together with models of the Wright Flyer, a V-2 rocket, a Bell X-1, a Vostok-3KA capsule, a Space Shuttle orbiter, and some Star Trek universe starships. A painting of this ship hangs on the wall of Earth's 602 Club in flashbacks that appeared in the Star Trek: Enterprise episode "First Flight" (2003).

Non-canon sources give more details: The 1979 Star Trek Spaceflight Chronology describes this "first interstellar liner" as a Declaration-class ship launched in 2123. The Star Trek Maps by New Eye Photography Editors, also published in 1979, listed this ship as a fusion drive probe that was Earth's first attempt to explore another star system. The Making of Star Trek: The Motion Picture, published in 1980, describes the ship as "the very first starship U.S.S. Enterprise".  

 Registry: Enterprise (NX-01)
 Class: NX
 Service: 2151–2161 (10 years)
 Captain: Jonathan Archer (Scott Bakula)

United Earth Starfleet's Enterprise is the main setting of Star Trek: Enterprise (2001–2005). Enterprise was the first Earth built starship capable of reaching Warp 5. The ship was commanded by Captain Jonathan Archer and played an instrumental role in the founding of several proto-Federation alliances. Enterprise had significant engagements with the Klingons, Suliban, Xindi and the Romulans and playing a central role in the "Temporal Cold War."  It is also featured as a model in Star Trek Into Darkness.

The Original Series era 
Three ships named USS Enterprise are featured in the original Star Trek television series and the first through seventh Star Trek films.

Registry: 
Class: Constitution
Service: 2245–2285 (40 years)
Captains: Robert April (James Doohan [voice], Adrian Holmes), Christopher Pike (Jeffrey Hunter, Sean Kenney, Anson Mount), James T. Kirk (William Shatner), Willard Decker (Stephen Collins), Spock (Leonard Nimoy).
The Federation's first Enterprise is the main setting of the original Star Trek series (1966–1969) and Star Trek: The Animated Series (1973–74). Having undergone an extensive rebuilding and refitting, Enterprise then appears in Star Trek: The Motion Picture (1979), Star Trek II: The Wrath of Khan (1982), and Star Trek III: The Search for Spock (1984) in which the starship is destroyed by its crew to escape capture. Depictions of the Enterprise made occasional appearances in later Star Trek series, before being reintroduced as the main setting of the prequel Star Trek: Strange New Worlds, portraying the ship's missions in the decade prior to The Original Series.

Details of the ship's appearance differed in the various series and films in which it appears. 
In the 1965 pilot episode "The Cage", whose footage was reused for a flashback to Captain Pike's command in the episode "The Menagerie" (1966), the ship's bridge featured a transparent dome ceiling 
that was absent for the rest of the Original Series. A significantly redesigned version of Captain Pike's Enterprise appears in Star Trek: Discoverys second season, set several years after the events of "The Cage". The new design for the Enterprise, which more closely matches the aesthetic of Discovery, debuted in 2018 at the conclusion of the season 1 finale, and would go on to become the main setting of the series Strange New Worlds.

When the Enterprise was reintroduced in the 1979 film Star Trek: The Motion Picture, the ship had just completed an extensive refit and redesign that included new slimmer warp nacelles, connected to the secondary hull by angled winglike struts. The updated design would be reused later for the Enterprises replacement, an identical starship given the name Enterprise and registry number NCC-1701-A.

Registry:  
 Class: Constitution-class refit 
Service: 2286–2293 (7 years)
Captains: James T. Kirk (William Shatner)
This ship first appears at the conclusion of Star Trek IV: The Voyage Home (1986) and is the main setting in the subsequent Star Trek movies which use the original crew. The ship is ordered "decommissioned" at the end of Star Trek VI: The Undiscovered Country (1991). Non-canon information concerning this ship includes paperwork included with the model kit, which indicated the ship was mothballed at the Memory Alpha ship museum, and the Shatnerverse novel The Ashes of Eden (1996), which depicted Enterprise-A's removal from the mothball fleet before being destroyed defending the planet Chal.

Registry: USS Enterprise (NCC-1701-B)
Class: Excelsior-class refit
Service: 2293–2329 (36 years)
Captains: John Harriman (Alan Ruck), Demora Sulu (portrayed in Generations by Jacqueline Kim)
The Enterprise-B was launched at the beginning of the film Star Trek Generations (1994). During the ship's maiden voyage, prior to it being properly fitted with essential systems, the crew encountered an energy ribbon known as the Nexus, through which James T. Kirk – captain of the two former Enterprise starships, NCC-1701 and NCC-1701-A – was officially declared missing and presumed dead.

The design of the Enterprise-B is nearly identical to that of the USS Excelsior, which first appeared in the 1984 film Star Trek III: The Search For Spock. Differences between the Enterprise-B and the Excelsior include: flarings on the outside of the secondary hull, additional and larger impulse engines, and slight differences between the nacelles as well as the bridge modules. Non-canon information concerning the Enterprise-B includes several licensed Star Trek novels in which Demora Sulu, daughter of Hikaru Sulu, followed Harriman as captain. There are also licensed guides, such as the Haynes Enterprise Manual, in which a list of the ship's captains includes Demora Sulu, William George, and Thomas Johnson Jr.

The Next Generation era
Three ships named Enterprise are featured in Star Trek: The Next Generation television series and four TNG-era films.

Registry: USS Enterprise (NCC-1701-C)
Class: Ambassador
Service: 2332–2344 (12 years)
Captains: Rachel Garrett (Tricia O'Neil) 
This ship's first and only appearance is in the Next Generation episode "Yesterday's Enterprise" (1990). It was destroyed attempting to defend the Klingon outpost Narendra III from Romulan attack. Survivors included Tasha Yar (Denise Crosby), whose alternate timeline version from "Yesterday's Enterprise" travels with the ship back in time to the battle over Narendra III. The actions of the Enterprise-C's crew became a catalyst for the alliance between the Federation and the Klingon Empire.

Registry: 
Class: Galaxy
Service: 2363–2371 (8 years)
Captains: Jean-Luc Picard (Patrick Stewart), William T. Riker (Jonathan Frakes), Edward Jellico (Ronny Cox)
The main setting of Star Trek: The Next Generation (1987–1994). During Star Trek Generations, Enterprise was lost in 2371 after an attack by the Duras sisters' renegade Klingon Bird-of-Prey which caused extensive damage, leading to a warp core breach. Although the saucer section was safely separated before the breach, the shock wave from the exploding engineering hull threw it out of control, and caused it to crash-land beyond recovery on Veridian III. The ship also appears in the first Deep Space Nine episode "Emissary" and the final Enterprise episode "These Are the Voyages..." 

Registry: 
Class: Sovereign
Service: 2372–2384 (12 years) 
Captain: Jean-Luc Picard (Patrick Stewart) 
The main setting for the films Star Trek: First Contact (1996), Star Trek: Insurrection (1998), and Star Trek: Nemesis (2002). She also appeared in the Season 1 finale of Star Trek Prodigy (2022).  As a Sovereign class vessel, it was the most advanced vessel in Starfleet, and an active participant in the Battle of Sector 001 and the Dominion War.

Registry:  
Class: Odyssey (Yorktown refit)
Service: 2386– 
Captain: TBD 
This ship will appear in season 3 of Star Trek: Picard (2023). This ship first appeared in the non-canon video game, Star Trek Online, and was designed by artist and graphics designer Adam Ihle as part of a fan competition.

Alternate timelines

Alternate future

Registry: USS Enterprise (NCC-1701-D)
Class: Galaxy refit
Service: circa 2395 
Captain: Full Admiral William T. Riker (Jonathan Frakes)
In "All Good Things...", the final episode of Star Trek: The Next Generation, Enterprise-D was shown in an alternate future where it had not crashed during the events of Star Trek Generations, and instead had been made Admiral William T. Riker's personal flagship.  A third warp nacelle allowed the ship to reach at least Warp 13, and the Enterprise-D had also been equipped with a spinal phaser lance, large phaser cannons on the saucer section, and cloaking ability, making it one of the most powerful starships seen in the Star Trek franchise.

Registry: USS Enterprise (NCC-1701-J)
 Class:  Universe
Service: 26th century 
The "Azati Prime" episode of Star Trek: Enterprise involves time travel and features a scene in which Enterprise-J appears. Enterprise-J operates in a possible timeline during the 26th century. In this timeline, Enterprise-J participated in the Battle of Procyon V, a climactic battle in which the Federation successfully drove the invasive trans-dimensional beings known as the Sphere Builders back into their own realm.  The ship's crew included a descendant of the Xindi scientist Degra.

Games (non-canon)

Registry: USS Enterprise (NCC-1701-F)
 Class:  Odyssey (Yorktown refit)
Service: 2409– 
Captain: Va'Kel Shon
One version of USS Enterprise (NCC-1701-F) appears in the massively multiplayer online role-playing game Star Trek Online. Its design is based on the entry submitted by Adam Ihle for the 2011 "Design the next Enterprise" contest, a joint venture between Cryptic Studios, CBS, and Intel, which ran shortly before the game went "free to play". Enterprise-F made its first appearance in the mission "Boldly They Rode", at the point where USS Enterprise-F appears to help the player defeat the Dominion fleet surrounding Deep Space Nine. Following its brief appearance in a trailer for Season 3 of Star Trek: Picard in October 2022, there was speculation that the Enterprise-F would finally become part of the official Star Trek canon.

Mirror universe
The Mirror Universe first appeared in the original series as an alternate reality where the militaristic Terran Empire exists in place of the regular universe's United Federation of Planets ("Mirror, Mirror"). A montage in the opening credits of the Star Trek: Enterprise episode "In a Mirror, Darkly" shows the Terran Empire logo in use by at least World War II, with licensed novels putting the divergence before Shakespeare, or even classic Greek literature.

Registry: ISS Enterprise (NX-01)
Class: NX
Service: 2150s
Captains: Maximilian Forrest (Vaughn Armstrong), Jonathan Archer (Scott Bakula)
The Star Trek: Enterprise episode "In a Mirror, Darkly" features a Mirror Universe version of NX-01 Enterprise. This ship is equipped with a cloaking device, deflector shields, a tractor beam, a prototype agony booth, and different exterior markings. It is commanded by Captain Maximilian Forrest, although for a brief time his first officer, Commander Jonathan Archer, takes command following a mutiny. This Enterprise is destroyed by the Tholians.

Registry: ISS Enterprise (NCC-1701)
Class: Constitution
Service: 2260s
Captains: Christopher Pike, James T. Kirk (William Shatner), Spock (Leonard Nimoy)
A Mirror Universe Enterprise appears in the original Star Trek episode "Mirror, Mirror". The ship is equipped with an agony booth and the mirror in the captain's quarters conceals Captain Kirk's deadly Tantalus device. ISS Enterprise was originally the same shooting model as the regular Enterprise. The remastered version of "Mirror, Mirror" includes a CGI version of Enterprise with "ISS" markings on the hull and minor physical differences from USS Enterprise, such as a larger deflector dish, a taller bridge, and altered nacelle details. The ship was also shown orbiting the planet in the opposite direction (clockwise instead of counter-clockwise).

Reboot (Kelvin timeline) films 
The 2009 Star Trek film takes place in a new reality created when the Romulan Nero traveled through time via an artificial black hole created by red matter. 
Registry: 
Service: 2258–2263 (5 years)
Captains: Christopher Pike (Bruce Greenwood), James T. Kirk (Chris Pine)

The main setting for the films Star Trek (2009), Star Trek Into Darkness (2013), and Star Trek Beyond (2016). Enterprise is shown during its construction phase at the Riverside Shipyard in Iowa during the first film.  A brief shot of the NCC-1701 is seen as the shuttlecraft carrying Kirk and the new recruits into space departs the shipyard later on in the movie. At the end of Star Trek Into Darkness, Enterprise started its five-year mission. The ship was later destroyed by Krall and his alien swarm attack during the events of Star Trek Beyond.

Measurements of this ship's length have ranged from 295 meters to 910 meters. The shuttle bay gave us a clear relative scale – shuttlecraft initially appeared much bigger than we had imagined – so we bumped up the Enterprise scale, which gave her a grander feel and allowed us to include more detail."

This would result in a height of 167m, and a beam of 339m.

Registry: 
Class: Constitution
Service: 2263–ongoing
Captains: James T. Kirk (Chris Pine)
Enterprise-A first appears at the end of Star Trek Beyond after the destruction of the original Enterprise when the crew resume their five-year mission.

Sean Hargreaves stated that he was given the brief to "beef up the neck and arms" on the Ryan Church design, but went further to give the ship echoes of Matt Jefferies' original design.

Development 
According to The Star Trek Encyclopedia, the registry number NCC-1701 was devised by Matt Jefferies, art director of the first Star Trek series, inspired by an old science fiction cover that Gene Roddenberry liked, with a starship flying through space. Jefferies, who was a pilot, based NCC on United States aircraft pre-1949 registration codes. In such pre-1949 usage, an "N" first letter refers to an aircraft registered in the United States. A "C" for a second letter refers to a civil aircraft. Jefferies added a second "C" because he thought it looked better.

The Franz Joseph Blueprints, the book The Making of Star Trek, and a handful of Star Trek novels speculate that NCC is an initialism for "Naval Construction Contract".

In an interview with the BBC, Jefferies explained that NC is the designation for U.S. commercial aircraft and the Soviet Union's space program used the CCCP designation. He concluded that any major future space projects would likely be a combined international effort, thus he invented the combined designation NCC. The 1701 had two functions, it represented the first (01) ship of a 17th federation cruiser design, and that the digits were unlikely to be misread, unlike 6, 8, or 9.

In Gene Roddenberry's original Star Trek pitch, the starship is described as a "United Space Ship", and in two episodes of The Original Series (TOS), Kirk refers to the "United Space Ship Enterprise".

Redesign for Star Trek: Planet of the Titans 

In 1976, before Star Trek: The Motion Picture, Paramount had planned a Star Trek film to have been named Star Trek: Planet of the Titans. Early in the production, Ralph McQuarrie had been hired to redesign the Enterprise. The major feature of the redesign was to replace the cigar-shaped secondary hull with a larger, triangle-shaped "delta wing" section. McQuarrie's design was discarded in favor of keeping the general shape of the Enterprise intact for the redesign unveiled in Star Trek: The Motion Picture.

Three decades later, the McQuarrie design for the Enterprise was adopted as the basis for the design of the USS Discovery in Star Trek: Discovery, a 2017 series that takes place ten years earlier than the original Star Trek.

Captain's yacht
The captain's yacht is a large auxiliary starship built into the design of several Federation starship designs including the Galaxy-class and Sovereign-class. It was docked to the underside of the saucer section. On USS Enterprise-E, the name of the captain's yacht is the Cousteau. In 2375, the crew of USS Enterprise-E used the Cousteau to travel to the surface of the Ba'ku homeworld, in the film Star Trek: Insurrection.

Designer Andrew Probert came up with the concept of the captain's yacht while designing the USS Enterprise-D. Although it was never seen in use, it is labeled on the master systems display screen in main engineering, docked at the bottom of the saucer section almost directly opposite the main bridge. Probert suggested possible ways for the yacht to be used during the first season, including not showing the yacht but mentioning it in dialogue, but his ideas were rejected. The producers almost used the yacht in the episode "Samaritan Snare", but decided to use an "executive shuttlecraft" due to budgetary constraints. According to Patrick Stewart, the yacht would have been called the Calypso. Producer Ronald D. Moore noted in the Star Trek: The Next Generation Technical Manual that real-life naval tradition would insist on calling such a craft the captain's gig, rather than the captain's yacht.

Rick Sternbach later designed similar craft for USS Voyager and USS Equinox, known as the aeroshuttle and the waverider, respectively. As on the Enterprise-D, however, these vessels were only depicted on technical schematics and never seen in operation or referred to in dialog.

Reception and influence
By contrast, in 2019, SyFy ranked the refit design of the Enterprise (NCC-1701 and NCC-1701-A) as the franchise's best,  ranking the original design as only the fourth best version of the starship.

Time described each iteration of the Enterprise as "a character in its own right". Over many decades, the starship has influenced real-life activities of NASA and the U.S. Navy:
 In 1976, as the result of a successful letter writing campaign by fans, NASA named the initial flight-test Space Shuttle Enterprise. However, the shuttle itself was never intended to fly in space, to be used only for initial atmospheric flight tests.
 For three days in October 1994, the aircraft carrier  hosted half-hour tours for thousands of fans attending a Star Trek convention in Norfolk, Virginia, and Star Trek memorabilia could be found throughout the ship.
 In 2014, NASA named its IXS Enterprise advanced propulsion concept vehicle after the Star Trek vessel.

Celebrity astrophysicist Neil deGrasse Tyson has spoken highly of the influence and legacy of the original Enterprise on other fictional spaceships. Drawing a parallel to comparing athletes between eras, he said of spaceship design, "What matters is not what they look like now, but what they looked to others at the time that they prevailed... There is only one spaceship that's earlier than [the original Enterprise], and that's the flying saucer from The Day the Earth Stood Still. So, what matters here is, what did [the Enterprise] look like at the time it came out (1966) compared with anything that had been imagined before? And when you consider that, that is the most astonishing machine that has ever graced the screen." On the ship's influence upon scientists, Tyson wrote, "The Enterprise was the first ever spaceship represented in storytelling that was not designed to go from one place to another; [it was] only designed to explore. It was revolutionary in terms of what we would think space would, and should, be about."

NetDragon Websoft, a gaming and mobile Internet company in Fuzhou, China, based the architectural design of its headquarters building on the Next Generation-era Enterprise (primarily the Enterprise-E), under an official license from CBS.

See also
 VSS Enterprise, proposed first commercial spacecraft

References

External links

Enterprise, ISS
Star Trek lists